is a train station in Ikoma, Nara Prefecture, Japan.

Lines 
Kintetsu
Ikoma Line

Surrounding Area 
 
 Higashi-Ikoma Station
 Tezukayama University Higashiikoma Campus

Adjacent stations 

Railway stations in Japan opened in 1927
Railway stations in Nara Prefecture